Geotrochus is a genus of air-breathing land snails, terrestrial pulmonate gastropod mollusks in the family Trochomorphidae.

Species
Species  within the genus Geotrochus include:
 Geotrochus affinis (E. A. Smith, 1894)
 Geotrochus bicolor (Martens, 1864)
 Geotrochus conicoides (Metcalfe, 1851)
 Geotrochus conus (L. Pfeiffer, 1841)
 Geotrochus kinabaluensis (E. A. Smith, 1895)
 Geotrochus kitteli Vermeulen, Liew & Schilthuizen, 2015
 Geotrochus labuanensis (L. Pfeiffer, 1864)
 Geotrochus meristotrochus Vermeulen, Liew & Schilthuizen, 2015
 Geotrochus multicarinatus (Boettger, 1890)
 Geotrochus niahensis (Godwin-Austen, 1891)
 Geotrochus oedobasis Vermeulen, Liew & Schilthuizen, 2015
 Geotrochus paraguensis (E. A. Smith, 1893)
 Geotrochus rimatus Vermeulen, 1997
 Geotrochus scolops Vermeulen, Liew & Schilthuizen, 2015
 Geotrochus spilokeiria Vermeulen, Liew & Schilthuizen, 2015
 Geotrochus subscalaris Vermeulen, Liew & Schilthuizen, 2015
 Geotrochus subtricolor (Mabille, 1887)
 Geotrochus sylvanus (Dohrn & C. Semper, 1862)
 Geotrochus verticillatus van Benthem Jutting, 1959
 Geotrochus whiteheadi (E. A. Smith, 1895)
 † Geotrochus xinanensis Yü & Zhang, 1982

References

 Bank, R. A. (2017). Classification of the Recent terrestrial Gastropoda of the World. Last update: July 16th, 2017.

External links
 Gude, G. K. (1913). Definitions of further new genera of Zonitidae. Proceedings of the Malacological Society of London. 10: 389-391